Domaniew may refer to the following places:
Domaniew, Poddębice County in Łódź Voivodeship (central Poland)
Domaniew, Sieradz County in Łódź Voivodeship (central Poland)
Domaniew, Masovian Voivodeship (east-central Poland)